The Netherlands have participated in the Eurovision Young Dancers 10 times since its debut in 1985. The Netherlands have hosted the contest once, in 2003. In 1987, Belgium and the Netherlands participated together.

Participation overview

Hostings

See also
Netherlands in the Eurovision Song Contest
Netherlands in the Eurovision Young Musicians
Netherlands in the Junior Eurovision Song Contest

External links 
 Eurovision Young Dancers

Countries in the Eurovision Young Dancers